Harald Grosskopf (born Harald Großkopf) is a German electronic musician. He played with several Krautrock and progressive rock bands of the 1970s in Germany, and released solo music.

Biography
Grosskopf was born in Hildesheim on October 23, 1949. He started his career in the 1960s as a drummer in the beat group The Stuntmen, and toward the end of the decade played in a then-unknown Scorpions. He later played drums in Wallenstein and Ashra, as well as for many of Klaus Schulze's solo albums. In 1980, he issued his debut LP, Synthesist, which became a cult classic of German electronic music. New York’s RVNG international label reissued the album, with remakes by James Ferraro, Oneohtrix and others in February 2011. In 1980 Grosskopf co-founded the Neue Deutsche Welle band Lilli Berlin, and he remained their drummer until 1983.

Discography

Solo albums

with Ash Ra Tempel 
 Starring Rosi (1973)

with Ashra 
 Correlations (1979)
 Tropical Heat (1991)
 @shra (1998)
 Sauce Hollandaise (1998)
 @shra Vol.2 (2002)

with Baltes, Grosskopf, Heilhecker 
 Viermaldrei (2001)

with Bernd Kistenmacher 
 Characters (1991)
 Stadtgarten Live (1995)

with Cosmic Jokers 
 Cosmic Jokers (1973)
 Galactic Supermarket (1974)

with Fishmoon 
 Twomoon Music (2007)

with Joachim Witt 
 Silberblick (1980)

with Klaus Schulze 
 Moondawn (1976)
 Body Love (1977)
 Body Love Vol.2 (1977)
 X (1978)
 Live (1980)

with Kosmische Kuriere 
 Sci Fi Party (1974)
 Planeten Sit-In (1974)

with Lilli Berlin 
 Lilli Berlin (1981)
 Süß und Erbarmungslos (1982)
 Huh huh (1983)

with Mario Schönwälder 
 Hypnotic Beats (1992)

with N-Tribe 
 Tower of Power (1998)

with Steve Baltes 
 Pictures in Rhythm (1995)
 Rhythm of Life (1998)

with Sunya Beat 
 Sunya Beat (1998)
 Delhi Slide (1999)
 Comin’ Soon (2006)

with Wallenstein 
 Blitzkrieg (recorded in 1971, released in 1972)
 Mother Universe (1972)
 Cosmic Century (1973)
 Storys, Songs & Symphonies (1975)

with Walter Wegmüller 
 Tarot (1973)

with Witthüser & Westrupp 
 Bauer Plath (1972)

with 17 Hippies 
 Wer ist das? (1999)
 17 Hippies play Guitar (2006)
 Biester (2014)
 Anatomy (2016)

Videography
Romantic Warriors IV: Krautrock (2019)

References

External links
Official website
Muzikzirkus: Interview mit Harald Grosskopf (in German)
Discogs

German electronic musicians
German drummers
Male drummers
German male musicians
1949 births
Living people